Green Duke House is a historic plantation house located at Soul City, near Manson, Warren County, North Carolina.  It was built about 1800 as a Georgian style dwelling, and remodeled in the post-Victorian style about 1900.  It is a two-story, five bay, frame dwelling with a hipped roof.  The front and rear facades feature one-story porches with elaborate Ionic order columns.  At the time of its listing, the house was being used as a day care center.

Duke was the surname of an early landowner, and Green the maiden name of his wife. The house was listed on the National Register of Historic Places in 1974.

References

Plantation houses in North Carolina
Houses on the National Register of Historic Places in North Carolina
Georgian architecture in North Carolina
Victorian architecture in North Carolina
Houses completed in 1800
Houses in Warren County, North Carolina
National Register of Historic Places in Warren County, North Carolina